Duz Anbar (also Romanized as Dūz ‘Anbar) is a village in Chendar Rural District, Chendar District, Savojbolagh County, Alborz Province, Iran. At the 2006 census, its population was 141, in 47 families.

References 

Populated places in Savojbolagh County